Arctic Research Foundation (ARF) is a private, non-profit organization based in Canada. Federally incorporated in 2011, ARF works with Indigenous and Northern communities, NGOs, government, private corporations and academia to facilitate science research and community initiatives. 

ARF’s mandate is to find innovative and flexible solutions to the unique challenges that are ever-present in the Arctic.

By developing effective science-community partnerships and physical infrastructure initiatives, ARF aims to contribute to the economic, social and spiritual well-being of communities, provide important and timely information on how and why the environment is changing, and inform systems-based, adaptive co-management approaches to climate adaptation.

History 
ARF was founded in 2011 by former co-CEO of Research in Motion, Balsillie, and Waterloo-area businessman, Tim MacDonald, to assist Parks Canada’s search for HMS Terror and HMS Erebus. 

English explorer Sir John Franklin set sail in search of the Northwest Passage in 1845. HMS Erebus, HMS Terror and crew were last seen by Inuit near King William Island and never returned to England.

Their disappearance prompted a 170-year search for the ships.

After seeing foreign vessels searching for the shipwrecks while flying over King William Island, Balsillie wanted to help bolster the Canadian efforts to locate the lost ships. After forming ARF, Balsillie and MacDonald decided to refurbish an Atlantic Canadian fishing vessel, the R/V Martin Bergmann, and make it available to Parks Canada’s archeologists. 

A Parks Canada led expedition located HMS Erebus in September 2014 after Inuit identified the search area. The wreck of HMS Terror was discovered two years later.

Due to its Arctic home port, ARF’s vessel, the R/V Martin Bergmann, was responsible for at least 80 per cent of territory surveyed during the search.

Current Operations 
When the search for the HMS Terror and the HMS Erebus concluded, Balsillie and MacDonald saw opportunities to expand the foundation in order to generate broader public interest in the Arctic and challenges faced in the region. 

ARF refocused its efforts on developing partnerships and infrastructure to support initiatives including food security, climate change and economic development.

Since 2011, ARF has made possible dozens of scientific missions and contributed to many cultural initiatives in Arctic regions with the operation of research vessels, remote mobile laboratories and community growing pods.

Research Vessels 
ARF maintains and operates 5 research vessels: the R/V Martin Bergmann, the R/V William Kennedy, the R/V Jenny Pierre, the R/V Tiriarnaq, and the R/V Nahidik. These vessels support numerous science and community programs across Canada’s Arctic regions.

The R/V Martin Bergmann 
The R/V Martin Bergmann is a repurposed Newfoundland fishing trawler stationed in Cambridge Bay, Nunavut and is operational during the ice free months of the year. The Bergmann is used for scientific research, archeological exploration and mapping waterways around Victoria Island.

The R/V William Kennedy 
The R/V William Kennedy is Canada’s first research vessel dedicated exclusively to Hudson Bay. The vessel is a refitted Atlantic Canadian fishing vessel operated by the Arctic Research Foundation in partnership with the University of Manitoba and the Churchill Marine Observatory, a multidisciplinary research facility located in Churchill. The R/V William Kennedy hosts a variety of researchers and scientists, including oceanographers, geneticists and biologists who partner with local communities to conduct scientific research throughout Hudson Bay.

R/V Nahidik 
The Nahidik is a shallow draft research vessel operating in Great Slave Lake and throughout the Mackenzie River in Northwest Territories. It is the largest vessel in the ARF fleet measuring 175 feet in length. The former coast guard vessel was refitted in partnership with the Government of Northwest Territories in 2019 and has been operational since. The vessel has supported various science projects including a study of Great Slave Lake’s bathymetry, geological surveys of the area and a youth science expedition in partnership with Northern Youth Leadership.

R/V Tiriarnaq 
Currently stationed in Victoria, British Columbia, the R/V Tiriarnaq, was a former coast guard vessel until 2019, when it was refitted to support science research. It is expected that the vessel will be stationed in the Northwest Territories in the future, and specialize in supporting near coastal research.

The R/V Jenny Pierre 
The R/V Jenny Pierre is a vessel co-owned by the community of Gjoa Haven and ARF, in the Kitikmeot Region of Nunavut. Community members reached out to ARF to refurbish the former converted lobster boat to meet the growing research needs of local groups, including its hunter and trapper organization.

Mobile Labs 
ARF operates four mobile science labs and one Plant Production and Research Pod, which is located in Gjoa Haven, Nunavut. 

Built out of sea containers, the labs are heated, insulated and equipped with toilets, water purifiers and satellite communication links. The labs are also capable of plugging into existing power networks or running completely off the grid, drawing electricity through environmentally friendly solar panels or wind turbines.

The mobile labs can be moved across remote Arctic environments, either by land or by sea.

Naurvik 
ARF’s first Mobile Plant Production and Research Pod is operating in the Northern community of Gjoa Haven, Nunavut. Local residents named the project, Naurvik, which means “the growing place.” 

The Plant Production and Research Pod is an adaptation of the mobile lab, further developed to grow fresh produce and test new agriculture technologies.   It is currently housed in two shipping containers powered by solar panels and wind turbines with a generator for backup when the wind and sun both fall short. 

First becoming operational in 2019, Naurvik currently harvests micro-greens and tomatoes that are distributed to community elders and residents. The crops harvested in the pod are chosen by the community.

The project is a collaboration with the Hamlet of Gjoa Haven, ARF, Agriculture and Agri-Food Canada, the National Research Council and the Canadian Space Agency.

Arctic Focus 
Arctic Focus is a media platform hosted and developed by ARF. Established in August 2018, Arctic Focus publishes stories from across the Arctic authored by researchers, Northern residents, explorers and journalists. It aims to foster education about Arctic regions while also offering a platform for Northern based creators and writers to publish their work.

See also 
 List of Arctic research programs

References

Arctic research
2011 establishments in Canada